BES Utilities is a UK-based, independently owned group of companies, comprising Business Energy Solutions Ltd and BES Commercial Electricity Ltd. With offices based in Fleetwood, Lancashire, BES Utilities provides commercial electricity and gas to businesses across the United Kingdom.

History
Business Energy Solutions Ltd (trading as BES Commercial Gas) was established in 2002 and BES Commercial Electricity Ltd was established in 2009.  BES Telecom Ltd was established in 2013 and subsequently sold in 2017.  In November 2015, BES Utilities applied for a water services licence with the Water Industry Commission for Scotland.

Company Growth
Since its formation, BES has grown to become one of the largest employers on the Fylde coast, with over 250 employees. BES Utilities was featured in the 2017 London Stock Exchange Group’s 1000 companies to Inspire Britain report. BES Utilities was amongst four companies within the North West credited with being the most dynamic and fastest-growing SMEs (small to medium-sized enterprises) in the country. In 2018 the company created an additional 50 new roles based at its Head Office in Fleetwood.

OFGEM & Trading Standards Investigation
BES Utilities were investigated by Office of Gas and Electricity Markets (Ofgem), who found that BES failed to explain in sufficient detail customer contract details and, in some cases, wrongly blocked 108 customers from switching suppliers. The Ofgem investigation resulted in a fine of £2.00, with an agreed redress package of circa £980,000 paid by BES by way of a charitable donation to a debt advice charity and via compensation payments to a number of affected customers. On 28 July 2016, BES offices were raided by Trading Standards as part of an investigation into the alleged mis-selling of contracts by independent brokers. BES subsequently launched a £8.6 million claim for damages against Cheshire West and Chester Trading Standards in 2017. In September 2021 owner Andrew Pilley was charged with fraud and money laundering offences made through BES.

Legal action
In January 2018, BES Utilities settled a High Court case against two men, in which the company had alleged that they had made false claims about the company for three years. Following the hearing, in the High Court at Manchester, the defendants were issued with court orders containing penal notices. They gave undertakings to the court to cease their behaviour and remove any published reference to BES, its directors, employees, agents and representatives.

Criminal Investigation and Fraud Charges

In September 2021 after 5-year fraud investigation, Andy Pilley and a number of BES's employees were charged with multiple fraud charges in relation to his running of BES Utilities. Fraud charges included two counts of running a business with the intention of defrauding creditors or others by allowing the fraudulent mis-selling of energy supply contracts, allowing fraudulent mis-selling by sales representatives, and being concerned with the retention of criminal property.

Charity, Community & Sponsorship

Fleetwood Town Football Club 
BES Utilities is the main sponsor of Fleetwood Town Football Club, which is a professional association football club based in the town of Fleetwood, Lancashire, England. Established in 1997, the current Fleetwood Town F.C. is the third incarnation of the club; it was first formed in 1908. The team compete in League One, the third tier of English football. Their home strip is red shirts with white sleeves and white shorts. The home ground is Highbury Stadium in Fleetwood, and the supporters are affectionately known as the Cod Army. The club won the 2011–12 Football Conference, and played in the Football League for the first time in its history in the 2012–13 season. In May 2014, at Wembley, Fleetwood won the promotion play-off to League One, the club's sixth promotion in 10 years.

Blackpool Illuminations 
BES Utilities partnered with Blackpool Illuminations, an annual lights festival in Lancashire, to provide electricity for the lights for free in 2014 and at a discounted rate in 2015. The expected value of the deal exceeded £100,000, making BES the largest contributor to the lights in the last ten years.

Brian Rose 
In 2018 BES Utilities, along with Fleetwood Town F.C. and Card Saver agreed to be the main sponsor of local championship boxer Brian Rose.

The BES Fund 
The Business Energy Solutions Fund is independently managed by a company called Charis Grants, who administer schemes for several leading energy and water companies.

In 2015 BES wrote to all of its non-domestic customers in the flood-affected areas offering financial support in a bid to help those who have suffered damage to buildings and ruined stock.

References

Electric power companies of the United Kingdom
Telecommunications companies of the United Kingdom
Energy companies established in 2002
Non-renewable resource companies established in 2002
Telecommunications companies established in 2002
2002 establishments in the United Kingdom